Tadhg Mór Ó hUiginn was an Irish poet.

Ó hUiginn was a member of a highly regarded Connacht O'Higgins family of bards. His surviving poems include:

 Gach éan mar a adhbha
 Slán fat fholcadh

See also
 O'Higgins family
 Tadg Óg Ó hUiginn
 Tadhg Dall Ó hUiginn
 Philip Bocht Ó hUiginn
 Maol Sheachluinn na n-Uirsgéal Ó hUiginn

External links
 http://celt.ucc.ie/published/G402121/index.html
 http://celt.ucc.ie/published/G402137/index.html

People from County Mayo
Medieval Irish poets
Year of birth missing
Year of death unknown
Irish male poets